The Almohad expedition to Dukkala was led by Abd al-Mu'min against tribesmen of Dukkala.

The Almohad under Abd al-Mu'min conquered Marrakech in 1147 CE. Subsequently, an Almoravid warlord, Ibn Hûd al-Mâssî, established himself amongst the tribesmen of Dukkala. Soon his authority was recognized throughout the Atlantic plain of Morocco,  the Middle Atlas range and even into the High Atlas.

Initially Abd al-Mu'min had ignored the tribesmen raiding the districts of Marrakesh. However, when the raiding increased under al-Mâssî, al-Mu'min led an army against the rebel tribesmen.

References

Battles involving the Almohad Caliphate